The Kėdainiai minaret is the only free-standing minaret in Lithuania. It is located in the city of Kėdainiai, in the city park, between the Kėdainiai train station and the Dotnuvėlė River.

History
The minaret was erected in 1880 by a Russian general, Eduard Totleben, who was the owner of an estate in Kėdainiai. It was built to commemorate his service in the Russian-Turkish war, in which he had participated. Local legend  claims that it was constructed in memory of his Turkish lover.

Architecture
The minaret is typical of Ottoman architecture. It is needle-topped, 25 meters high and has a balcony which can be reached by interior stairs. There are two plaques affixed to its wall. One is written in Ottoman Turkish and describes a beautiful palace built by the Ottoman sultan. The second plaque bears an Arabic inscription from the Koran, sura Al-Baqara, verse 255 āyatu-l-kursī which says "Who is it that can intercede with Him (God) except by His (God's) permission" ?

The minaret is a local architectural monument.

References 

Monuments and memorials in Lithuania
Islamic architecture
Buildings and structures in Kėdainiai
Towers completed in 1880